Kharak Singh (22 February 1801 – 5 November 1840) was the second Maharaja of the Sikh Empire. He was the eldest son of Maharaja Ranjit Singh, founder of the Sikh Empire and his consort, Maharani Datar Kaur. He succeeded his father on 27 June 1839 and reigned until his dethronement and imprisonment on 8 October 1839. He was succeeded by his only son Nau Nihal Singh.

Early life
He was born on 22 February 1801 in Lahore, Punjab. He was the first son of Ranjit Singh and his second wife Datar Kaur Nakai. His mother was the daughter of Ran Singh Nakai, third ruler of the Nakai Misl. The prince was named by his father  "Kharak" (ਖਰਕ) which means 'Wielder of the Sword' he was named after the unconquerable warrior mentioned in Dasam Granth. According to Gyani Sher Singh, Ranjit Singh knew the entire Dasam Granth by heart. It was his birth that persuaded his father to proclaim himself the Maharaja of Punjab.

He married four times. In 1812, at the age of 11 he was married to Chand Kaur Kanhaiya, daughter of Sardar Jaimal Singh, chief of the Kanhaiya Misl. Their son Nau Nihal Singh was born in 1821. In 1816, the prince was married to Bibi Khem Kaur Dhillon, a Jat Sikh daughter of Jodh Singh Kalalvala and granddaughter of Sahib Singh Dhillon. After the Second Anglo-Sikh War in 1849, Bibi Khem's jagirs were reduced by the British raj due to her anti-British role in the war. His third wife was, Kishan Kaur Samra, a daughter of Chaudhari Raja Singh of Amritsar of the Samra clan; they were married in 1818. She was the only queen to live after the fall of the Sikh Empire in 1849, had an annual pension paid by the British Raj of RS 2324 and died in Lahore in 1876 while living at the Lahore Fort. His last wife, Inder Kaur Bajwa was married by proxy in a "chadar dalna" ceremony, in 1815. She was a relative of Chet Singh Bajwa.

Early military campaigns and administration 

Kharak Singh was brought up in his family's martial tradition and assigned to a variety of military expeditions. While barely six years old, he was given the command of the Sheikhupura expedition. In 1811, he was placed in charge of the Kanhaiya estates, and deputed in 1812 to punish the recalcitrant chiefs of Bhimbar and Rajauri. Kharak received the principality of Jammu as his jagir in 1812.

Since his birth he was heir of his father. But Sada Kaur only viewed him as heir presumptive as her daughter Mehtab Kaur was the first queen of Ranjit Singh. In 1816 to put an end to all intrigues Ranjit Singh officially announced Kharak Singh as his heir apparent and anointed him "Tikka Kanwar Yuvraj" (Crown prince).

The same year, his mother, Mai Nakain took over his training for 18 months and even accompanied him to his expedition Multan. During the battle the queen herself oversaw the steady supply of grain, horses, and ammunition being sent to the at Kot Kamalia, a town equally distanced between Multan and Lahore. In 1818, together with Misr Diwan Chand he commanded an expedition against the Afghan ruler of Multan Nawab Muzaffar Khan, achieving a decisive victory at the Battle of Multan. He was invested with the command of Siege of Multan (1818) as well as of Battle of Shopian in 1819, which resulted in Srinagar and Kashmir getting annexed into the Sikh Empire. When the Sikh army entered the city of Srinagar after the battle, Prince Kharak Singh guaranteed the personal safety of every citizen and ensured the city was not plundered. The peaceful capture of Srinagar was important as Srinagar, besides having a large Shawl-making industry, was also the center of trade between Panjab, Tibet, Skardu, and Ladakh.

He was also sent on similar campaigns undertaken by Ranjit Singh for the conquest of Peshawar and against the Mazaris of Shikarpur.

In 1839, Ranjit Singh awarded Kashmir to Kharak Singh, which was seen as a check on the ambitions of Gulab Singh Dogra.

On the advice of Fakir Azizuddin, before his death his father proclaimed him the Maharaja of the Sikh Empire.

Maharaja of the Sikh Empire

On the death of his father he was proclaimed the Maharajah and installed on the throne at Lahore Fort on 1 September 1839.

Kharak Singh was a patron of arts and had commissioned a Sanskrit astronomy manuscript – the Sarvasiddhantattvacudamani.

Though courageous and good in battle, Kharak was regarded as simple minded. It was believed he lacked his father's diplomatic skills. He developed a close relationship with his tutor Chet Singh Bajwa after the death of his mother, who gained such an ascendancy over him as to render him a puppet. This relationship with Chet Singh created tensions with Prime Minister Raja Dhian Singh.

The Austrian physician, Johann Martin Honigberger who was present at court, described his coronation as a dark day for the Punjab, and referred to the Maharaja as a blockhead who twice a day deprived himself of his senses and spent his whole time in a state of stupefaction. Historians challenge the popular oriental notion of Kharak Singh being considered "imbecile", as said by Alexander Burnes and Henry Montgomery Lawrence -who has never met Kharak Singh. Burns was the first to refer to Kharak Singh as imbecile but also mentions that Prince Kharak is extremely kind hearted and noted that the prince is the master of an impressive military and good at the administrating and handling important strategic and governing duties assigned to him.

Claude Martin Wade, who was at the Lahore Durbar for 16 years disagreed as well, stating that Kharak Singh was a man with a “mild and humane disposition, who was “loved by his dependants”. Wade suggests that Kharak Singh seemed to have a has a dismal reputation as he maintained a low profile. Dr. Priya Atwal and Sarbpreet Singh note that Kharak Singh was politically intelligent and well versed in multiple language, the most educated prince of Maharaja Ranjit Singh who not only led military expeditions but also diplomatic events. Sarbjeet Singh states Kharak Singh along with his brothers is a victim of circumstance, something he labeled "A Shakespearean tragedy".

Death
Raja Dhian Singh Dogra is known to resent the influence of Chet Singh Bajwa, tutor of Kharak Singh on the emperor, as well as the court. It was whispered that both the Maharaja and Chet Singh were secretly planning to sell out the Punjab to the British, pay them six annas in every rupee of state revenue and, worse of all, disband the Sikh army. Misled by these fictitious tales, the court and Nau Nihal Singh became estranged from Kharak Singh.

Chet Singh was assassinated on Oct. 9, 1839. Early that morning the conspirators entered the Maharaja's residence in the Fort and assassinated Chet Singh in the presence of their royal master, who vainly implored them to spare the life of his friend.

Kharak Singh was poisoned with white lead and mercury. Within six months he was bedridden, and eleven months after the poisoning he died on 5 November 1840 in Lahore. The official announcement blamed a sudden mysterious illness. Though never proven, most contemporaries believed Raja Dhian Singh to be behind the poisoning. Dhian Singh also murdered one of Kharak Singh's wife, Rani Inder Kaur by setting her on fire.

Raja Dhian Singh had previously resisted attempts to allow Kharak training in statecraft, and on 8 October 1839 he instigated his removal from the throne with Nau Nihal Singh becoming de facto ruler.

See also
Gurdaspur District

References

Singh, Harbans "The encyclopedia of Sikhism. Vol III." pages 494–495
"Bibi Khem Kaur Dhillon", URL accessed 11/16/06

External links
 Genealogy of Kharak Singh

  
 

Sikh emperors
1801 births
1840 deaths
Indian Sikhs
Ranjit Singh
Punjabi people
People from Lahore